Asclerobia sinensis is a species of snout moth in the genus Asclerobia. It was described by Aristide Caradja and Edward Meyrick in 1937 and is known from China.

References

Moths described in 1937
Phycitini
Moths of Asia
Taxa named by Aristide Caradja